Zamindars of Krishna district hold an important place in the history of Madras Presidency. Krishna district holds some huge Zamindari estates like Nuzvid Estate, Chintalapati Vantu, Devarakota, Repalle, Vallur etc. which are both extensive and wealthy estates.

Permanent Settlement 
In 1802, the British after settling the facts with Nizam and Local Poligars and Zamindars they made permanent settlement in which they issued sanads to pay the government peskash annually. There are many ancient Zamindaries in this district, and also newly formed but Most influential Zamindars too. when Charles Donald Maclean surveyed about the zamindaries in the Madras Presidency he mentioned 34 Zamindaries in the District. They are:

Later 
After 1877 few years later few other villages and estates from Godavarai District are annexed into Krishna District. Estates were also sub divided and few were transferred from one Zamindar to other.

Huge Zamindari's 
The Banaganapalle State is an offshoot of the Nawab of Masulipatam which is in Krishna District.
Nuzvid Estate comprises 18 paraganas which is nearly about 288 villages.
Vasireedy Family once ruled the Estate over 530 villages etc.

Further reading 
Source:Manual of the Kistna District in the Presidency of Madras has given the genealogies of 15 influential families of Krishna District Published in the year 1883 by Mackenzie, Gordon .

References 

India history-related lists
Zamindari estates
History of Andhra Pradesh
Madras Presidency